The Juba Nuer Massacre occurred on December 15 to 18, 2013, in the capital of South Sudan. The massacre of the Nuer people was carried out by South Sudan President Salva Kiir's Presidential Guards called the "Tiger Battalion," numbering between 4,000 to 15,000 Soldiers. The mass killings of Nuer civilians led to the creation of the Protection of Civilian (PoC) camps next to the UN base for those who managed to flee their killers. The killings of Nuer in Juba stoked tensions in Jonglei, Upper Nile, and Unity States, leading to widespread violence across the country, including revenge killings.

The Juba Nuer Massacre has been termed "an ethnic cleansing", which is short of calling the massacre a genocide.

Tiger battalion 
The forces that were doing the killing were discovered to be The Tiger battalion, an irregular force outside South Sudan's conventional military, which were trained, armed, and supported by Uganda People Defense Forces(UPDF) prior to the December 15 Juba Massacre. These tribal forces were recruited from the Dinka-populated state of Northern Bahr al Gazal by former governor Paul Malong Awan with the directive from South Sudan President Salva Kiir. They go by different names, such as "Dot Ke Beny," meaning rescue the President in Dinka language, or Mathiang Anyoor, meaning Brown Caterpillar. "President Salva Kiir ordered the Governor of Northern Bahr el Ghazal to recruit youth from two places: "They were trained in Luri – not part of any security service – but a private army that Salva trained using elements of the UPDF to train and arm them". In the worst single incident documented by Human Rights Watch, soldiers and policemen from around the Gudele and other nearby neighborhoods gathered hundreds of Nuer men during the night of December 15 and the following day and detained them in a building used by the police, near the junction that divides Juba’s Gudele 1 and Gudele 2 neighborhoods. Survivors estimated that between 200 and 300 men were jammed into a room so crowded and hot that several people collapsed during the day on December 16. At around 8 p.m., gunmen alleged to be government forces began systematically shooting into the room through windows on one side of the building, killing almost all of the people in the room, a few survivors said

Deaths 
From December 15-18, 2013, it was estimated that 15,000 to 20,000 individuals of Nuer ethnicity were collected, and killed in the capital city of Juba, South Sudan, by the Salva Kiir Presidential Guard, the Tiger battalion.  In one particular incident, Soldiers rounded up approximately 200-400 Nuer men and placed them in a police building, killing them by shooting through the windows, while another witness reported seeing 200-300 bodies in Juba Teaching Hospital the following day. There was also evidence of mass graves around Juba after the Juba Nuer massacre

Impact 
A 2019 scientific study warned of emerging evidence of the dehumanization of Nuer, citing massacres as the main cause. A mechanistic dehumanization was discovered toward the Nuer, but no similar dehumanization was found among the Nuer toward Dinka: although there were clear signs of intergroup bias. The study highlighted how such a dehumanization process could lead to future genocide and massacre, if not reverse

References

1. Afriyie, F. A., Jisong, J., & Yaw Appiah, K. (2020). Comprehensive analysis of South Sudan conflict: determinants and repercussions. Journal of Liberty and International Affairs, 6(1), 33-47. Scholarhttps://www.ssoar.info/ssoar/bitstream/handle/document/67602/ssoar-jlibertyintaff-2020-1-afriyie_et_al-Comprehensive_analysis_of_South_Sudan.pdf

2. Calissendorff, L., Brosché, J., & Sundberg, R. (2019). Dehumanization amidst massacres: An examination of Dinka-Nuer intergroup attitudes in South Sudan. Peace and Conflict: Journal of Peace Psychology, 25(1), 37. Dehumanization amidst massacres: An examination of Dinka-Nuer intergroup attitudes in South Sudan.

3. CNN (2013) South Sudan: What's going on. South Sudan: What's going on | CNN Politics

4. CNN (2013). South Sudan's neighbors threaten to step in to end fighting. South Sudan's neighbors threaten to step in to end fighting

5. Final report of the African Union Commission of Inquiry on South Sudan, 2014 Final report of the African Union Commission of Inquiry on South Sudan - South Sudan | ReliefWeb

6. Human Rights Watch, 2014. South Sudan: Ethnic Targeting, Widespread Killings
South Sudan: Ethnic Targeting, Widespread Killings

7. Human Rights Watch(2013). HRW documents massacre of 200-300 Nuer men in government building in Juba (January 17) HRW documents massacre of 200-300 Nuer men in government building in Juba

8. Human Rights Watch (2013). UN rights chief zeroes in on Gudele massacre. UN rights chief zeroes in on Gudele massacre

9. Krause, J. (2019). Stabilization and local conflicts: communal and civil war in South Sudan. Ethnopolitics, 18(5), 478-493. Stabilization and Local Conflicts: Communal and Civil War in South Sudan

10. Leithead, Alastair (March 9 2017). "South Sudan conflict: 'Soldiers will kill you for no reason in Yei'". BBC. Retrieved March 9 2017.BBC (2017). "South Sudan conflict: 'Soldiers will kill you for no reason in Yei'". BBC. Retrieved March 9 2017. South Sudan conflict: 'Soldiers will kill you for no reason in Yei' - BBC News

11. Nyadera, I. N. (2018). South Sudan conflict from 2013 to 2018: Rethinking the causes, situation and solutions. African Journal on Conflict Resolution, 18(2), 59-86. South Sudan conflict from 2013 to 2018: Rethinking the causes, situation and solutions

12. Radio Ramazuj (2013). Report: 'Police Building' Massacre in South Sudan. Report: ‘Police Building’ Massacre in South Sudan

13. Sudan Tribune (2016). Juba massacre survivor calls for justice and forgiveness. 

14. Sudan Tribune. Remember Juba Massacre, 2017 

15. Sudan Tribune (2018). A shattered hope: Revisiting the horrors of Juba's massacre. 

16. UN (2013). UN Rights Chief zeroes in on Gudele massacre (January 24). UN rights chief zeroes in on Gudele massacre

17. Voice of America (2014). HRW Documents Ethnic Killings in S. Sudan. HRW Documents Ethnic Killings in S. Sudan

Further reading 
 Afriyie, F. A., Jisong, J., & Yaw Appiah, K. (2020). Comprehensive analysis of South Sudan conflict: determinants and repercussions. Journal of Liberty and International Affairs, 6(1), 33-47. Google Scholar Afriyie, F. A., Jisong, J., & Yaw Appiah, K. (2020).... - Google Scholar
 Calissendorff, L., Brosché, J., & Sundberg, R. (2019). Dehumanization amidst massacres: An examination of Dinka-Nuer intergroup attitudes in South Sudan. Peace and Conflict: Journal of Peace Psychology, 25(1), 37. Dehumanization amidst massacres: An examination of Dinka-Nuer intergroup attitudes in South Sudan.
 CNN (2013) South Sudan: What's going on. South Sudan: What's going on | CNN Politics
 CNN (2013). South Sudan's neighbors threaten to step in to end fighting. South Sudan's neighbors threaten to step in to end fighting
 Final report of the African Union Commission of Inquiry on South Sudan, 2014 Final report of the African Union Commission of Inquiry on South Sudan - South Sudan | ReliefWeb
South Sudan: Soldiers Target Ethnic Group in Juba Fighting
 Human Rights Watch, 2014. South Sudan: Ethnic Targeting, Widespread Killings
South Sudan: Ethnic Targeting, Widespread Killings
 Human Rights Watch(2013). HRW documents massacre of 200-300 Nuer men in government building in Juba (January 17) HRW documents massacre of 200-300 Nuer men in government building in Juba
 Human Rights Watch (2013). UN rights chief zeroes in on Gudele massacre. UN rights chief zeroes in on Gudele massacre
 Krause, J. (2019). Stabilization and local conflicts: communal and civil war in South Sudan. Ethnopolitics, 18(5), 478-493. Stabilization and Local Conflicts: Communal and Civil War in South Sudan
 Leithead, Alastair (March 9 2017). "South Sudan conflict: 'Soldiers will kill you for no reason in Yei'". BBC. Retrieved March 9 2017.BBC (2017). "South Sudan conflict: 'Soldiers will kill you for no reason in Yei'". BBC. Retrieved March 9 2017. South Sudan conflict: 'Soldiers will kill you for no reason in Yei' - BBC News
 Nyadera, I. N. (2018). South Sudan conflict from 2013 to 2018: Rethinking the causes, situation and solutions. African Journal on Conflict Resolution, 18(2), 59-86.
 Radio Ramazuj (2013). Report: 'Police Building' Massacre in South Sudan. Report: ‘Police Building’ Massacre in South Sudan
 Sudan Tribune (2016). Juba massacre survivor calls for justice and forgiveness. 
 Sudan Tribune. Remember Juba Massacre, 2017 
 Sudan Tribune (2018). A shattered hope: Revisiting the horrors of Juba's massacre. 
 UN (2013). UN Rights Chief zeroes in on Gudele massacre (January 24). UN rights chief zeroes in on Gudele massacre
 Voice of America (2014). HRW Documents Ethnic Killings in S. Sudan. HRW Documents Ethnic Killings in S. Sudan

2013 in South Sudan
Massacres in South Sudan
Massacres in 2013